Thomas McGrath or Tom McGrath may refer to:

 Thomas McGrath (builder) (1896–1988), Northern Irish builder who founded Ulster Garden Villages
 Thomas McGrath (poet) (1916–1990), American poet best known for Letter To An Imaginary Friend
 Thomas C. McGrath Jr. (1927–1994), U.S. Representative from New Jersey
 Thomas McGrath (Wisconsin politician) (1859–1920), state legislator in Wisconsin
 Tom McGrath (animator) (born 1964), animation director
 Tom McGrath (artist) (born 1978), American painter
 Tom McGrath (hurler) (1891–1958), Irish hurler
 Tom McGrath (media executive) (born 1956), Hollywood entertainment executive
 Tom McGrath (playwright) (1940–2009), Scottish playwright and musician
 Tom McGrath (producer) (died 1985), Irish television producer
 Tom McGrath (rugby league) (1898–1976), Australian rugby player
 Tom McGrath (runner) (born 1950), Irish-American runner